Qusajin (also Romanized as Qūsajīn; also known as Gūsūn, Qūsajan, and Qūsūn) is a village in Khvoresh Rostam-e Shomali Rural District, Khvoresh Rostam District, Khalkhal County, Ardabil Province, Iran.

It is located west of the Qizil Üzan river, in the Alborz (Elburz) mountain range.

At the 2006 census, its population was 97, in 31 families.

References 

Towns and villages in Khalkhal County
Settled areas of Elburz